The Sandwich tern (Thalasseus sandvicensis) is a tern in the family Laridae. It is very closely related to the lesser crested tern (T. bengalensis), Chinese crested tern (T. bernsteini), Cabot's tern (T. acuflavidus), and elegant tern (T. elegans) and has been known to interbreed with the lesser crested. It breeds in the Palearctic from Europe to the Caspian Sea wintering to South Africa, India and Sri Lanka.

The Sandwich tern is a medium-large tern with grey upperparts, white underparts, a yellow-tipped black bill and a shaggy black crest which becomes less extensive in winter with a white crown. Young birds bear grey and brown scalloped plumage on their backs and wings. It is a vocal bird. It nests in a ground scrape and lays one to three eggs.

Like all Thalasseus terns, the Sandwich tern feeds by plunge diving for fish, usually in marine environments, and the offering of fish by the male to the female is part of the courtship display.

Taxonomy

The terns are small to medium-sized seabirds, gull-like in appearance, but usually with a more delicate, lighter build and shorter, weaker legs. They have long, pointed wings, which gives them a fast buoyant flight, and often a deeply forked tail. Most species are grey above and white below, and have a black cap which is reduced or flecked with white in the winter.

The Sandwich tern was originally described by ornithologist John Latham in 1787 as Sterna sandvicensis, but was recently moved to its current genus Thalasseus (Boie, 1822) following mitochondrial DNA studies which confirmed that the three types of head pattern (white crown, black cap, and black cap with a white blaze on the forehead) found amongst the terns corresponded to distinct clades. The current genus name is derived from Greek Thalassa, "sea", and sandvicensis, like the English name, refers to Sandwich, Kent, Latham's type locality. In birds, the specific name sandvicensis usually denotes that the species was first described from Hawaii, formerly known as the "Sandwich Islands", but the Sandwich tern does not occur there.

This bird has no subspecies. A former subspecies is now treated as a separate species called Cabot's tern (T. acuflavidus). It breeds on the Atlantic coasts of North America, northern and eastern South America, and has wandered to Western Europe.

Description

The Sandwich tern's weight ranges from 180-300 g (6.3-10.6 oz).

The Sandwich tern's thin sharp bill is black with a yellow tip, except in the yellow or orange billed South American race. Its short legs are black. Its upperwings are pale grey and its underparts white, and this tern looks very pale in flight, although the primary flight feathers darken during the summer.

The lesser crested tern and elegant tern differ in having all-orange bills; lesser crested also differs in having a grey rump and marginally stouter bill, and elegant in having a slightly longer, more slender bill. The Chinese crested tern is the most similar to the Sandwich tern, but has a reversal of the bill colour, yellow with a black tip; it does not overlap in range with the Sandwich tern so confusion is unlikely.

In winter, the adult Sandwich tern's forehead becomes white. Juvenile Sandwich terns have dark tips to their tails, and a scaly appearance on their back and wings, like juvenile roseate terns.

The Sandwich tern is a vocal bird; its call is a characteristic loud grating kear-ik or kerr ink.

Behaviour
This species breeds in very dense colonies on coasts and islands, and exceptionally inland on suitable large freshwater lakes close to the coast. It nests in a ground scrape and lays one to three eggs.

Like all Thalasseus terns, the Sandwich tern feeds by plunge-diving for fish, almost invariably from the sea. It usually dives directly, and not from the "stepped-hover" favoured by Arctic terns. The offering of fish by the male to the female is part of the courtship display.

Status
It has a population estimated at 460,000–500,000 individuals. Population trends have not been quantified, but the species is not believed to approach the thresholds for the population decline criterion of the IUCN Red List (i.e., declining more than 30% in ten years or three generations). For these reasons, the species is evaluated as least concern.

The Sandwich tern is among the taxa to which the Agreement on the Conservation of African-Eurasian Migratory Waterbirds (AEWA) applies. Parties to the agreement are required to engage in a wide range of conservation actions which are describes in a detailed action plan. This plan should address key issues such as species and habitat conservation, management of human activities, research, education, and implementation.

References

Further reading

External links

 
 
 
 
 
 
 
 
 

Sandwich tern
Birds of Central Asia
Birds of Europe
Birds of the Caribbean
Birds of the Dominican Republic
Birds of South America
Birds of islands of the Atlantic Ocean
Birds of subantarctic islands
Birds of Africa
Sandwich tern
Sandwich tern